Bodo (variants Botho,  Boto, Boddo, Potho, Boda, Puoto, etc.) is an Old High German name, also adopted in Modern German. It is in origin a short name or hypocorism for Germanic names with a first element Bod-, Puot-, reflecting the verbal root beud- "to bid, command".
As a monothematic name, Old High German Boto, Old Saxon Bodo, could mean "lord, commander" or alternatively "messenger" (c.f. Old English bod "command; message", boda "messenger, angel").
Full dithematic names with this first element (attested for the medieval period but not surviving into modern use) included Bodegisil, Bothad, Bodomar, Boderad, Poterich, Bodirid, Butwin, Potelfrid, Botolf, Podalolf, Bodenolf.

The Anglo-Saxon cognate is Beda (West Saxon Bīeda, Northumbrian Bǣda, Anglian Bēda).

Middle Ages
 Bodo (deacon) (c. 814–876), German deacon who converted to Judaism, assuming the name of Eleazar
 Bodo VII, Count of Stolberg-Wernigerode (1375–1455), German count
 Bodo III, Count of Stolberg-Wernigerode (1467–1538), German count

Modern era
 Bodo Abel (born 1948), German professor
 Bodo Andreass (born 1955), German boxing coach
 Bodo Battenberg (born 1963), German equestrian
 Bodo Baumgarten (born 1940), German painter, sculptor, graphic artist, and educator
 Bodo Bischoff (born 1952), German musicologist and choral conductor
 Bodo Bittner (1940–2012), West German bobsledder
 Bodo Bockenauer (born 1940), German former figure skater
 Bodo Dettke (born 1967), Solomon Islands politician
 Bodo Ebhardt (1865–1945), German architect, architectural historian, and castle explorer
 Bodo Ferl (born 1959), East German retired bobsledder
 Bodo Hauser (1946–2004), German journalist and writer
 Bodo Hell (born 1943), Austrian writer
 Bodo von Hodenberg (1604–1650), German regional administrator and poet
 Bodo Hombach (born 1952), German politician
 Bodo Igesz (1935–2014), Dutch stage director
 Bodo Illgner (born 1967), German former football goalkeeper
 Bodo Kirchhoff (born 1948), German writer and novelist
 Bodo Klimpel (born 1963), German politician
 Bodo Kox (born 1977), Polish film director, actor, and screenwriter
 Bodo Kuhn (born 1967), German sprinter
 Bodo Lafferentz (1897–1974), German Nazi member and high-ranking SS officer
 Bodo Linnhoff (born 1948), chemical engineer and academic
 Bodo Lukowski (born 1961), German wrestler
 Bodo Otto (1711–1787), German-born American physician
 Bodo Ramelow (born 1956), German politician
 Bodo Rudwaleit (born 1957), German former football goalkeeper
 Bodo Sandberg (1914–2005), Dutch military pilot
 Bodo Schäfer (born 1960), German author and public speaker
 Bodo Schiffmann (born 1968), German doctor and conspiracy activist
 Bodo Schlegelmilch, business educator, academic, and marketing theorist
 Bodo Schmidt (born 1967), German football coach and former player
 Bodo Sieber (born 1979), German former international rugby union player
 Bodo Sperlein, German product designer and brand consultant
 Bodo Sperling (born 1952), German artist, painter, and inventor
 Bodo Spranz (1920–2007), German researcher, director, and ethnologist
 Bodo Thyssen (1918–2004), German industrialist and medical doctor
 Bodo Tümmler (born 1943), German former middle distance runner
 Bodo Uhse (1904–1963), German writer, journalist, and political activist
 Bodo von Borries (1905–1956), German physicist
 Bodo von Dewitz (1950–2017), German art historian
 Bodo Zimmermann (1886–1963), German general

References

Masculine given names
German masculine given names